Kuvale is a Southern Bantu language spoken in Angola, in the middle of a large Umbundu-speaking area. It has traditionally been considered a dialect of Herero; however, Maho (2009) has moved it from Bantu Zone R.30 to Zone R.10, which includes Umbundu and a few smaller languages. Ngendelengo may be a distinct language.

References

Herero language
Languages of Angola